Fenusa is a genus of common sawflies in the family Tenthredinidae. There are about 11 described species in Fenusa.

Species
These 11 species belong to the genus Fenusa:
 Fenusa alaskana Kincaid
 Fenusa altenhoferi (Liston, 1993)
 Fenusa carpinifoliae (Liston, 1993)
 Fenusa dohrnii (Tischbein) (European alder leafminer)
 Fenusa julia Smith & Eiseman, 2017
 Fenusa laevinota (Benson, 1968)
 Fenusa pumila Leach, 1817 (birch leafminer)
 Fenusa pusilla (Lepeletier)
 Fenusa ulmi Sundevall (elm leafminer)
 † Fenusa primula Rohwer, 1908
 † Lithoryssus parvus (Brues, 1906)

References

Further reading

 

Tenthredinidae
Sawfly genera
Articles created by Qbugbot
Taxa named by William Elford Leach